Waterford is a small riverside suburb of Perth, the state capital of Western Australia. Its local government area is the City of South Perth.

Waterford is situated on the Canning River.

History 
Originally part of the suburb of Karawara, the area south of Manning Road was renamed Waterford in the 1980s.

The area is named after the birthplace in Ireland of Edmund Rice, the founder of the Christian Brothers.   From 1901, the Christian Brothers were allocated land for the Clontarf Orphanage, a school and farm for orphaned and disadvantaged boys, situated on 2 square kilometres of land south of Manning Road and along the shores of the Canning River. The college is now known as the "Clontarf Aboriginal College" and is governed by a representative Board of Management which is responsible to the Catholic Archbishop of Perth through the Director of Catholic Education of Western Australia.  The day-to-day running of Clontarf Aboriginal College, including the hiring of all staff and the enrolment of students, is the responsibility of the College Principal.

From 1981, portions of the land were progressively sold by Trinity College, an independent boys school in Perth which owned the land, and subdivided for housing. Streets within Waterford reflect the Irish theme, and are named after places in Ireland. Trinity College holds a remaining portion of the land which has been developed into the school's playing fields for training and PSA sport fixtures.

The 1984 five-bedroom, two-bathroom Perth Telethon Home was built by Statesman Homes in Waterford, on Cashel Way. It was auctioned live on TVW-7 and sold for A$120,000. This was a new record, as the previous Telethon Home in 1983 sold for A$97,500.

Education 
Waterford is near Curtin University on Manning Road. Many foreign students rent or own homes in Waterford because of its vicinity to the university and to the Waterford Plaza Shopping Centre.

References 

Suburbs of Perth, Western Australia
Suburbs in the City of South Perth
Canning River (Western Australia)